Anna Hubáčková (born 6 September 1957) is a Czech politician, who served as Czech Minister of the Environment in Petr Fiala's Cabinet from December 2021 to November 2022. She was a member of the Czech Senate from 2016 to 2022, as a nominee of KDU-ČSL.

References

1957 births
Living people
People from Hodonín District
Women government ministers of the Czech Republic
21st-century Czech women politicians
Environment ministers of the Czech Republic
KDU-ČSL Government ministers
KDU-ČSL Senators
Members of the Senate of the Czech Republic
Masaryk University alumni
Women mayors of places in the Czech Republic